Palmerston is a planned satellite city of Darwin, the capital and largest city in Australia's Northern Territory. The city is situated approximately 20 kilometres from Darwin and 10 kilometres from Howard Springs and the surrounding rural areas. Palmerston had a population of 33,695 at the 2016 census, making it the second largest city in the Northern Territory.

There are eighteen suburbs in Palmerston, ten of which are close to the Palmerston city centre. Palmerston is mostly residential with two light industrial areas in the north of the city.

History

1864–1911

Palmerston was the name chosen in 1864 for the capital of the Northern Territory by the South Australian Government, which was then responsible for its administration, in recognition of Lord Palmerston, who became Prime Minister of the United Kingdom of Great Britain and Ireland in 1855. The first site, as chosen by Boyle Travers Finniss at Escape Cliffs near the mouth of the Adelaide River, on the coast of Adam Bay on the western side of the Cape Hotham peninsula in 1864, was abandoned in 1867 and a second laid out by Surveyor-General George Goyder near Port Darwin in 1869. The town was officially renamed Darwin in April 1911 after responsibility for the Northern Territory passed to the Commonwealth of Australia and was officially gazetted as the City of Darwin in 1959.

1971–present
The land for a new satellite city of Darwin was acquired in 1971 by the Australian Government after concerns of under-supply of residential land in Darwin. The site was selected as the land was adjacent to existing transportation corridors. The decision to proceed with the development was made in 1980 and for the third time, the name of Palmerston was selected for the new city. Planning and development was managed by the Palmerston Development Authority.

Development of Palmerston began during the early 1980s. Suburbs of Palmerston were built in stages. The first suburbs built were Gray and Driver, followed by Moulden, then Woodroffe and Marlow Lagoon. The urban area continued to grow throughout the 1990s, with the new suburbs of Bakewell, Rosebery and Durack. The population growth of Palmerston continues to be the highest in the Northern Territory.

The population increased by almost 8,000 people between 1991 and 2001 to a total of 21,000 people. Palmerston's population growth is expected to continue and reach over 40,000 people by 2023.

In 1995/1996 the construction commenced on 5 new Palmerston suburbs, Rosebery, Bakewell, Durack, Gunn, and Farrar. These were developed in stages. In 2000 the Palmerston Town Council sought and obtained a change in the name of the municipality to City of Palmerston.

Since then, other suburbs have been registered and remain in various stages of development, including Archer (2001), Bellamack (2001), Johnston (2007), Zuccoli (2007) and Mitchell (2007).

Landmarks

The major landmark in Palmerston is the Power and Water Corporation's water storage tank, which supplies the city with fresh potable water. Formerly, the city had a large escarpment in the heart of the city, with extensive walking paths and a small creek, but the area has since been converted into an open grassy area; the community space known as Goyder Square.

Geography
Palmerston is located between the outer industrial areas of Darwin and the rural areas of Howard Springs, 20 kilometres (13 mi) southeast of Darwin, and is situated in the local government area of the City of Palmerston.

The urban area of Palmerston extends from the Stuart Highway in the north and east and the East Arm inlet to the west and south.

Regions and suburbs

The City of Palmerston initially consisted of the Palmerston Town (CBD), as well as suburbs of Driver and Gray. These were followed by Moulden and Woodroffe after development in those areas commenced in 1983. Also included in the City of Palmerston are the semi-rural suburb of Marlow Lagoon, the suburb of Archer and the industrial zones of Yarrawonga and Pinelands. Further developments have occurred leading to the creation of the suburbs of Rosebery, Bakewell, Gunn, Durack and more recently Farrar, Bellamack, Johnston, Zuccoli and Mitchell. The newer suburbs are located on the south-east side of the existing city.

Climate
Palmerston has a tropical savannah climate (Aw) like Darwin with distinct wet and dry seasons. The dry season runs from May to September. In the coolest months of June and July, daily temperature range is 19 to 35 °C. The wet season is associated with tropical cyclones and monsoon rains. The majority of rainfall occurs between December and March when thunderstorms are common and humidity is regularly over 80 per cent.

Demographics

As of the 2016 Census, there were 33,695 people in Palmerston. The median age of persons in Palmerston was 28 years. 18.9% of the population of Palmerston were children aged between 5–14 years, and 47.1% were persons aged 25–54 years. 74.8 per cent of Palmerston's population are Australian born; the biggest overseas birthplaces were England (692 or 2.9 per cent), New Zealand (437 or 1.9 per cent), the Philippines (278 or 1.2 per cent), Papua New Guinea (144 or 0.6 per cent) and East Timor (116 or 0.5 per cent).

The 2006 Census found the most inhabitants in Palmerston practice 'no religion' (6,106 or 25.9 per cent), Catholicism (5,263 or 22.3 per cent), Anglican (3,561 or 15.1 per cent), Uniting Church (1,205 or 5.1 per cent) and Presbyterian and Reformed (419 or 1.8 per cent).

Palmerston's population represents one quarter of the combined Palmerston-Darwin total population, and represents 11.7% of the Northern Territory's population.

Population growth
Palmerston is one of the fastest-growing cities in Australia. Palmerston recorded the fastest increase of population of all the local government areas in the Northern Territory. Palmerston increased by 1,300 people, growing by 5 per cent.  The fastest growth occurred within Palmerston which includes the suburbs of Farrar, Rosebery, Marlow Lagoon and Gunn and Palmerston City.

Government

The Palmerston region is covered by the Local Government Area of the City of Palmerston. The council was created in 1985. The council chambers are located in the Palmerston City Centre.

The Palmerston City Council (Incorporated under the Northern Territory Local Government Act 1993) governs the City of Palmerston which takes in the CBD and the suburbs. The City of Palmerston has governed Palmerston since 1985. It is governed by a seven-member council comprising the mayor, deputy mayor and five aldermen. Unlike Darwin, the city is not divided into wards and all councillors are elected at-large. The current mayor of Palmerston is Athina Pascoe-Bell, who was elected in the local government election on 24 March 2018.

In territory politics, Palmerston is split between five Legislative Assembly districts. The districts of Blain, Brennan and Drysdale are entirely within the city.  The district of Spillett is located mostly within Palmerston, but its area reaches up to eastern Darwin. The mostly rural district of Nelson spills into the city.  Historically, Palmerston has been a bastion of conservatism, with Country Liberal Party candidates usually winning by wide margins. Labor never came remotely close to winning seats in Palmerston until 2005, when that year's massive Labor landslide saw Labor take Brennan and Drysdale off the CLP.  However, those seats reverted to form in the 2008 election.

At the 2016 general election, however, Labor took Brennan and Drysdale off the CLP, while Blain fell to then-independent Terry Mills, a former CLP Chief Minister. The CLP, however, gained victories in Brennan and Nelson, while Labor retained Drysdale and Mills lost his seat of Blain to Labor's Mark Turner at the 2020 election. Currently, Palmerston is represented by two Labor members and two CLP members.

In federal politics, most of Palmerston's suburbs are located in the House of Representatives division shared with Darwin – the Division of Solomon, with the remaining suburbs in the city's outskirts located within the Division of Lingiari. The MP from 2010 to 2016, and the current Administrator of the Australian Indian Ocean Territories, Natasha Griggs, was a Palmerston resident and a former member of Palmerston City Council. The current members for the Division of Solomon and Lingiari are Labor members Luke Gosling and Warren Snowdon, respectively.

Economy
Palmerston has around 19,800 people in the labour force. In March 2017, the unemployment rate in the city was 3.98 per cent which was above the Northern Territory average of 3.5 per cent.

The largest industry employers in Palmerston are public administration & safety (2,751 or 21.3 per cent), retail trade (1,190 or 9.2 per cent), construction (892 or 6.9 per cent), health care & social assistance (829 or 6.4 per cent) and education & training (825 or 6.4 per cent). The total numbers of businesses in Palmerston was 1,410. Of these, 57% of businesses were categorised as non-employing.

Retail
Palmerston has four major shopping centres: Palmerston Shopping Centre, Bakewell Shopping Centre, Gateway Shopping Centre, and Oasis Shopping Village. The Palmerston Shopping Centre contains over 69 businesses including a Coles Supermarket, and the discount department store Target. Oasis Shopping Village contains a Coles supermarket and 18 businesses. Stage 1 of the new Gateway Shopping Centre has numerous specialty stores including Big W, Best & Less, and Woolworths. Stage 2 includes the Pavilions Dining and Entertainment area, as well as Gateway Home—which opened in early 2018.

Education
For further information see Schools in the Northern Territory.

Preschool, primary and secondary
Palmerston is served by 11 state primary schools, two Catholic primary schools, two private schools, one state secondary school (Palmerston College) and one Catholic secondary school (MacKillop Catholic College). There are over 5,867 primary and secondary students enrolled in Palmerston with 2,942 students attending primary education and 1,292 students attending secondary education. There are over 3,100 students enrolled in government schools in Palmerston, 1087 students enrolled in Catholic schools and 625 students enrolled in independent schools.

In 2017, the now former Rosebery Middle School amalgamated into Palmerston's secondary school campus of Palmerston Senior College (formerly Driver High School) to create the dual campus facility, Palmerston College.

Tertiary and vocational
The Charles Darwin University Palmerston campus is located in the suburb of Durack. The campus hosts the School of Tourism and Hospitality as well as expanding into a mini-School of Conservation and Land Management. There are over 4,318 students enrolled in tertiary and further education courses. In 2008, 247 of Palmerston residents were enrolled in higher education at Charles Darwin University and 4,071 students enrolled in vocational education and training.

Sport and recreation
Palmerston is home to the Palmerston Football Club (known as the "Magpies") Northern Territory Football League (AFL) and is based out of the Archer Sporting Complex. Palmerston has a strong presence in Australian rules football. The Archer Sporting Complex has an Australian rules football field, a senior Softball diamond and senior Baseball diamond. There are also a number of sporting clubs located at the complex. The complex home to the, Palmerston and Rural Baseball Club, and the Palmerston Pirates Softball team.

There are three Rugby Union teams in the Palmerston area. These are the Palmerston Crocs, the Swampdogs and the MacKillop Saints.

The Palmerston Raiders Rugby League team are based at Goodline Park in the Southern suburbs.

Palmerston has one association football team, the Palmerston Rovers FC which plays in the Northern Zone League.

The city has a skate park located on University Avenue that is funded by the Palmerston City Council.

There is also a local near-Olympic size swimming pool with a gymnasium.

There is also a boat ramp allowing access to the Elizabeth River for small trail-able marine craft. Persons utilising the area are cautioned that both box jellyfish and crocodiles are present in the river.

A branch of the YWCA is located at the CBD.

The Palmerston Scouts are based at MacKillop Catholic College.

Palmerston has one major tennis centre. Opened in January 2012 it includes 7 courts, BBQ area and canteen. The centre offers group coaching and competition opportunities for people of all ages.

Palmerston is well served by its many park reserves. Some parks also offer coin-operated public barbecue facilities.

Palmerston Golf & Country Club has a full 18-hole design

Media
The Northern Territory News, published daily by News Corp, is widely available in Palmerston. Its Sunday edition, The Sunday Territorian, and the national newspaper, The Australian, are also published by News Corp and are also available in Palmerston. Most large statewide and interstate newspapers are also available from local retailers, albeit with a delay in arrival.

Palmerston also receives radio and television services sourced from transmitters located in the Darwin region. Which include the three commercial channels 7 Darwin, Nine Darwin and Darwin Digital Television and the two Government-owned channels ABC and SBS. Pay television is also available through satellite, fixed cable and IPTV from various providers, such as Foxtel and Fetch.

Palmerston receives most of the radio stations from Darwin, which include ABC Local Radio (105.7FM), Radio National (657AM), ABC Classic FM (107.3FM) and Triple J (103.3FM), as well as commercial radio stations Mix 104.9 and Hot 100 and community radio station 104.1 Territory FM.

Transport

The city has a network of bicycle paths, most of which are lit for night-time usage.

There is also a public bus service operated by Darwinbus that offers transportation around Palmerston, into Darwin City and out to Darwin's northern suburbs.

Darwin International Airport is the closest air terminal in Palmerston. The airport is located in the Darwin suburb of Marrara, approximately 20 minutes away from Palmerston.

Darwin-based taxis are also available in Palmerston, as well as a number of local and Darwin-based mini-bus operators.

Utilities

Water storage and supply, as well as sewerage services for Palmerston, are managed by Power and Water Corporation, while power is managed by Jacana Energy, both of which are owned by the Northern Territory Government. The corporation is also responsible for management of sewerage and the major water catchments in the region. Water is mainly stored in the largest dam, the Darwin River Dam which holds up to 90% of Palmerston's water supply. For many years, the city's principal water supply came from Manton Dam.

Palmerston and its suburbs are powered by the Channel Island Power Station, the largest power plant in the Northern Territory.

Health
Many of Palmerston's health needs are serviced by the Palmerston Health Precinct which includes the Palmerston Community Care Centre, public dental service, St John Ambulance, Medical Specialists Clinic and the Farrar Medical Centre. There are seven general practices in the Palmerston health region, four of which provide after-hours services.

There are two hospitals serving the Palmerston area. These are Royal Darwin Hospital, located in the Darwin suburb of Tiwi and Palmerston Regional Hospital, which is located in Holtze.

References

External links

 Palmerston City Council site

 
Cities in the Northern Territory
Suburbs of Darwin, Northern Territory
Populated places established in the 1980s